Denny's (also known as Denny's Diner on some of the locations' signage) is an American table service diner-style restaurant chain.  It operates over 1,700 restaurants in many countries.

Description
Originally opened as a coffee shop under the name Danny's Donuts, Denny's was known for always being open and serving breakfast, lunch, and dinner 24 hours a day. Denny's did not close on holidays and nights, except where required by law. Many restaurants are located in proximity to freeway exits, bars, and in-service areas.

Denny's started franchising in 1963, and most Denny's restaurants are now franchisee-owned. Franchise agreements require 24/7 service in most locations. Because of the impact of the COVID-19 pandemic on the restaurant industry in the United States, many Denny's had to close for the first time, and may now have limited hours of operation.

History

Denny's was founded by Harold Butler and Richard Jezak, who opened Danny's Donuts in Lakewood, California in 1953. In 1956, a year after Jezak's departure from the 6-store chain, Butler changed the concept, shifting it from a donut shop to a coffee shop with store No. 8. Danny's Donuts was renamed Danny's Coffee Shops and changed its operation to 24 hours. During the 1950s, Los Angeles architects Armet & Davis created a new prototype building with a boomerang-shaped roof that became a model for stores built all over the country. They also designed a second prototype in 1965 with a zigzag shingled roof. These designs enabled googie architecture to spread across America. Many Denny's locations were built near freeway offramps, leading to increasingly larger signage. In 1959, to avoid confusion with the Los Angeles restaurant chain Coffee Dan's, Butler changed the name from Danny's Coffee Shops to Denny's Coffee Shops. In 1961, Denny's Coffee Shops was renamed Denny's. The business continued to expand, and by 1981, there were over 1,000 restaurants in all 50 U.S. states. The company absorbed many of the old Sambo's restaurants and used their mid-century design in some of their restaurants. In 1977, Denny's introduced the still-popular Grand Slam breakfast. In 1994, Denny's became the largest corporate sponsor of Save the Children, a national charity. All but six Denny's closed for the first time ever on Christmas 1988; many of the restaurants were built without locks, and some of them had reportedly lost their keys.

Denny's main offices were located in La Mirada, California, until 1989. At that time, the office was first moved to Irvine, California and subsequently moved to the Spartanburg, South Carolina, headquarters of the parent company Trans World Corporation (TW Corporation) that acquired Denny's in 1987. In 1992, private equity firm, Kohlberg Kravis Roberts acquired a 47% interest in TW Corporation, later known as The Flagstar Companies, and encouraged the company to sell non-core businesses. On July 12, 1997, Flagstar, Denny's parent company, filed for Chapter 11 bankruptcy. Eventually, Denny's operations dominated the parent company to such an extent that The Flagstar Companies changed its name again to Denny's Corporation. It now trades on the NASDAQ under the symbol DENN.

From 1990 through 1996, Denny's offered a free meal to anyone on their birthday. The offer included a limited number of meal options from a special birthday menu. The promotion began in the 1990s; though occasionally individual franchises had offered it before that time. Because too many people went to Denny's more than once on their birthdays, the management had to restrict the rules to only one meal per person, per birthday, only on the actual birthday, with proof of legal birth date required, such as a driver's license, other photo ID, or a birth certificate. Since 2009, the restaurant chain has offered a free Birthday Build-Your-Own Slam on the customer's birthday.

In 1994, Denny's began renovating its stores, with a lighter color scheme; select locations also began serving Baskin-Robbins ice cream for a short time. Houston, Texas, was the test market for the chain-wide renovation.

Denny's opened its first restaurant in Australia in December 1982, in the suburb of Forest Hill, Melbourne. The Australian franchise was owned by Ansett Australia and expanded into other states throughout the 1980s. However, changing tastes of the Australian consumer led to the sale of the chain in 1989 and its closure shortly thereafter.

Denny's Diner prototype

 

Some of Denny's restaurants employ the "diner" concept, using modular buildings that resemble classic 1950s diners. In May 1997, the first Denny's Classic Diner was opened in Fort Myers, Florida. The diner concept was created by Ron, Marcia, Marc, and Todd York, the principals of Denny's Franchisee SWFRI, Inc. Today, there are about 40 Denny's Diners in the United States. Additionally, there are several diners that resemble the modular buildings but are actually stick construction.

Domestic and international growth
In July 2010, Denny's presence in the United States saw a major expansion when Pilot Flying J started opening Denny's locations inside their Flying J-branded truck stop locations. 123 Pilot Flying J conversions were eventually completed.

As of the end of 2011, there were a total of 1,685 Denny's restaurants. While the company still owns and operates some restaurants, the majority are now operated through a franchising model. 1,593 of Denny's 1,698 restaurants are located in the U.S. (including the District of Columbia, Guam and Puerto Rico), one in Chile, 60 in Canada, five in Mexico, three in Costa Rica, two in Honduras, two in El Salvador, two in the United Kingdom and eight in New Zealand. There is also a Denny's attached to the Holiday Beach Hotel in Otrabanda, Willemstad, Curaçao. Along with the regular Denny's menu, the Curaçao restaurant offers a selection of local ("kriyoyo") dishes. This is also true of the two locations in Guam, which have a separate "Only on Guam" menu featuring Chamorro-style dishes.

There are also about 578 Denny's restaurants in Japan operated independently under a license by a subsidiary of Seven & I Holdings since 1984. 
The first Denny's restaurant in Japan opened on the first floor of the Ito-Yokado in Kamiōoka (:ja:上大岡), Kōnan-ku, Yokohama, Kanagawa Prefecture on April 27, 1974, however, it closed on March 20, 2017 on account of the demolition of the building of Ito-Yokado.

In June 2012, Denny's opened a location in the Las Américas International Airport, its first location in an airport and its first in the Dominican Republic. In July 2012, Denny's announced it had signed an agreement with a franchisee to open 50 restaurants in southern China over 15 years, beginning in 2013. This makes it Denny's largest international development deal at that time.

On August 29, 2014, Denny's opened its first location in New York City, with some patrons waiting as long as two hours before its official opening to eat there. Located in Lower Manhattan, the location is designed to be more upscale than the typical Denny's, serves alcohol, and offers a location-exclusive $300 Grand Cru Slam, which is the typical Grand Slam Breakfast served with a bottle of Dom Pérignon. It closed in January 2018.

In November 2017, it was announced that Denny's was to open its first UK restaurant in Swansea in December 2017 as part of Parc Tawe's 15 million redevelopment scheme, occupying a 4,000 sq ft unit. The restaurant opened on Christmas Day 2017 for the homeless people in the city of Swansea, although the official opening to the general public was on December 27.

Health inspection records
In October 2004, Dateline NBC aired a segment titled "Dirty Dining", in which the 10 most popular family and casual dining chains in the United States were examined: Applebee's, Bob Evans, Chili's, Denny's, IHOP, Outback Steakhouse, Red Lobster, Ruby Tuesday, TGI Friday's, and Waffle House. As part of the segment, the producers examined the health inspection records for 100 restaurants over 15 months and totaled all of the critical violations or violations that can result in adverse effects to the customers' health. Denny's had the fewest violations, averaging fewer than one violation per restaurant. Denny's attributes this relative success to its adherence to the principles of Hazard Analysis and Critical Control Points.

Animal welfare efforts
Denny's works with the Humane Society of the United States to address animal welfare issues.

In 2008, Denny's began switching to cage-free eggs.

In 2012, the company announced that it will work with its suppliers to move away from the practice of keeping pigs in gestation crates.

Controversies

Discrimination
Denny's has been involved in a series of discrimination lawsuits involving food servers denying or providing inferior service to racial minorities, especially black customers.

A 1993 incident occurred when six black United States Secret Service agents visited a Denny's restaurant in Annapolis, Maryland. They were forced to wait an hour for service while their white companions were seated immediately.

In San Jose, California, in 1991, several black teenagers were refused service unless they agreed to pay in advance.

In 1994, Denny's settled a class action lawsuit which was filed by black customers who had been refused service, forced to wait longer, or pay more than white customers. The $54.4 million settlement was the largest to date under federal public-accommodations laws established thirty years earlier.

In 1995, a black Denny's customer in Sacramento, California was told that he and his friends had to pay up front at the counter upon ordering their meals. He questioned the waitress: "We asked the waitress about it and she said that some black guys who had been in the restaurant earlier had made a scene and walked out without paying their bill. So the manager now wanted all blacks to pay up front."

In 1997, six Asian-American students from Syracuse University visited a local Denny's restaurant late at night. They waited for more than half an hour as white patrons were regularly served, seated, and offered more helpings. They complained to management and to their server but were forced to leave the establishment by two security guards called by Denny's management. Then, according to the students, a group of white men came out of Denny's, attacked them and shouted racial epithets. Several of the students were beaten unconscious.

After the $54.4 million settlement, Denny's created a racial sensitivity training program for all employees. Denny's has also made efforts at improving its public relations image by featuring African-Americans in their commercials, including one featuring Sherman Hemsley and Isabel Sanford, actors from the popular The Jeffersons television series. In 2001, Denny's was chosen by Fortune magazine as the "Best Company for Minorities." In 2006 and 2007, Denny's topped Black Enterprise's "Best 40 Companies for Diversity."

In 2014, a Denny's location in Deming, New Mexico was subjected to a discrimination claim by an LGBT group, alleging that wait staff used homophobic slurs and refused to serve a group of gay, lesbian, and transgender customers who were attending a gay pride celebration. One year later, Denny's agreed to donate $13,000 to Deming Pride, pay $3,250 to a female customer who was subjected to the abusive behavior by wait staff, and retrain its employees with regard to discrimination policies.

In 2017, the staff at a Denny's in Vancouver was accused of making an Indigenous woman pay for her meal before it was served. After the customer left, restaurant staff called police to report the incident, alleging that the patron had a sharp metal object in their pocket.

Sudden closures
In June 2017, eight Denny's locations in Colorado, including Colorado Springs and Pueblo, abruptly shut down due to a franchise owner failing to pay nearly $200,000 in back taxes as well as over $30,000 in sales tax from the previous year. In addition, several employees claimed there were issues with accounts not being paid, bounced checks, and paychecks not arriving on time. As a result of the seizure of the eight Denny's locations by the IRS, numerous employees were left without employment and claimed that no advanced warning was given regarding the sudden closures. The franchise owner responsible for the closures immediately fled the state of Colorado.

See also
 List of pancake houses

Notes

References

  (previously published in 1986 as Googie: Fifties Coffee Shop Architecture )

External links

 

Restaurants established in 1953
Companies based in South Carolina
Companies listed on the Nasdaq
Companies that filed for Chapter 11 bankruptcy in 1997
Restaurant chains in the United States
Fast-food chains of the United States
Pancake houses
Companies based in Spartanburg, South Carolina
1953 establishments in California